The effects of Hurricane Wilma in The Bahamas were generally unexpected and primarily concentrated on the western portion of Grand Bahama. It weakened and struck eastern Mexico as a Category 4 hurricane on the Saffir–Simpson scale, and accelerated northeastward to make landfall on southwestern Florida on October 24. After crossing the state, Wilma briefly restrengthened in the open Atlantic Ocean, moving north of The Bahamas before weakening and later becoming an extratropical cyclone.

While passing the archipelago, Wilma produced hurricane-force winds and powerful storm surge, flooding southwestern coastal areas of Grand Bahama and destroying hundreds of buildings. Damage totaled about $100 million (2005 USD), almost entirely on the western half of the island. Central Grand Bahama, including the Freeport area, reported minor to moderate damage, while the eastern end received little to no damage. One child died on the island from the flooding. Elsewhere in the Bahamas, moderate damage occurred on Abaco and Bimini, while islands further to the south reported minimal wind damage.

Preparations
At 1200 UTC on October 23, about 24 hours before Wilma made its closest approach to the archipelago, the government of The Bahamas issued a hurricane warning for the northwestern portion of the territory, including the Abacos, Andros Island, Berry Islands, Bimini, Eleuthera, Grand Bahama, and New Providence. The government of The Bahamas advised citizens to rush preparations to completion, though many failed to fully prepare, believing Wilma would pass through the region as a tropical storm. Many homes failed to board windows or apply hurricane shutters, as well. Officials ordered evacuations for the eastern and western portion of Grand Bahama island, and established multiple shelters on the island. Evacuations were minimal; it is estimated that between 300 and 1,000 people left. As most people failed to prepare sufficiently for the hurricane, hardware stores and food markets were generally well-stocked.

Impact
Damage was estimated at $100 million (2005 USD) on the western portion of the island. Excluding the southwestern region of Grand Bahama, the majority of the island reported minor wind damage, and the eastern end of the island reported little, or no, damage. Over 7,000 people on the island were directly affected by the hurricane, many of whom had not fully recovered from hurricanes Frances and Jeanne during the previous year.

Significant damage was reported in coastal areas of Grand Bahama Island, with widespread destruction of roofs and vehicles, along with downed poles and trees. Power and telephone services were disrupted throughout the island. A total of 400 structures sustained damage, of which about 200 commercial buildings were severely damaged and recommended by engineers not to be repaired. Among the destroyed buildings were a police station on the western end and several buildings in Freeport. More than 500 automobiles were flooded, including five police cars. The storm surge also raised 54 corpses in five graveyards on the island. Several resorts were closed for an extended period of time, all on the western portion of the island. One hotel, the Xanadu Beach and Marine Resort, reported about $3.5 million in damage (2005 USD), including numerous destroyed windows designed to withstand hurricane-force winds. Further to the east, numerous houses and commercial buildings lost their roofs in the city of Freeport. One serious traffic accident occurred when the winds overturned a bus, inflicting injuries on the driver. Several other traffic accidents were reported in the area, although none were severe. During the passage of the hurricane, five cases of looting were reported, of which one person was caught in the process. Storm surge from the hurricane killed one child, the only casualty directly related to Wilma in the archipelago.

Damage was also heavy on Bimini island, where heavy rainfall and powerful storm surge damaged homes, trees, and utility poles. On the island, the hurricane severely damaged a hotel and eight waterfront homes. On Abaco, eight homes and a governmental clinic were destroyed. The storm surge destroyed a government dock and caused flooding and beach erosion near the coast. New Providence and the Berry Islands also reported minor wind damage from Wilma, primarily to downed trees and power lines. Throughout the Bahamas, Wilma damaged public infrastructure such as schools, roads, health clinics, and electrical systems.

Hurricane Wilma also forced filming for Pirates of the Caribbean to be temporarily halted, with the cast and crew being evacuated. Filming of Pirates of the Caribbean: Dead Man's Chest had been taking place at Sandy Cay, Exuma, at the time Wilma passed, causing considerable damage to the set.

Aftermath

By about two days after the passage of Hurricane Wilma, 800 residents on Grand Bahama remained in shelters, including 65 families who lost their homes and stayed in a hotel set up as a government shelter in Freeport. On Bimini, most residents who evacuated to shelters returned to their homes within two days of the hurricane. The Bahamian Red Cross quickly assessed the damage on Grand Bahama and Bimini, and successfully requested to be included under the federation's hurricane appeal for Central America. Local Red Cross chapters mobilized all available resources to assist the residents most affected. The Bahamian Red Cross began a three-month program to distribute food and other items to 1,000 of the 3,500 affected families, primarily on Grand Bahama; the remaining 2,500 families received assistance from the government and other organizations. Volunteers delivered building materials and provided water vouchers to those affected. In Nassau, the Red Cross disaster contingency stock sent a boat with food items, blankets, health kits, tarpaulins and water. About a week after the hurricane, the United States Agency for International Development began providing $50,000 (2005 USD) to the Bahamian National Emergency Management Agency for the purchase and distribution of emergency supplies. The agency also provided $9,000 (2005 USD) for locally contracted helicopter assessments in the affected areas. Red Cross agencies throughout the Caribbean provided hygienic kits, plastic sheeting, blankets, and jerry cans.

Electricians had power restored to the Freeport area by the day after the storm, and had power restored to most of the western portion of the island within three weeks after the hurricane. Work crews quickly removed road debris and tree limbs, and by the day after the passage of Wilma most roads were cleared. The passage of the hurricane left 1,000–4,000 people and hundreds of animals homeless. The earlier effects of Wilma on Mexico left many tourist areas in that country closed, leading to a 10% increase in tourism in the Bahamas in December 2005. By about three weeks after the hurricane, the airport on Grand Bahama Island was reopened, and all but one resort were also reopened; the remaining resort was reopened about two months after the hurricane.

See also

List of retired Atlantic hurricane names
Meteorological history of Hurricane Wilma
Hurricane Katrina, another Category 5 hurricane of the same season

References

External links

Bahamas
Wilma
2005 in the Bahamas
Wilma
Wilma Bahamas